The 2000 Euro Beach Soccer League, was the third edition of the Euro Beach Soccer League (EBSL), the premier beach soccer competition contested between European men's national teams, known as the European Pro Beach Soccer League at the time, occurring annually since its establishment in 1998. The league was organised by Pro Beach Soccer S.L. (PBS) between June 3 and September 3, 2000 in five different nations across Europe.

As in previous seasons, the teams of the league continued to compete as one group across a number of rounds of fixtures to gain regular match points and additional bonus points for the overall league table. This was the last season of the EBSL to take place under this original format, as major changes were introduced the following season including amendments to the presentation of the stages of fixtures and introduction of the Superfinal. Austria did not return from last season and were replaced by the Netherlands who competed for the first time.

The 2000 season has been noted as having one of the most exciting endings to a season in the early years of the EBSL; defending champions Spain and challengers and arch-rivals Portugal both went into the very final game of the season against each other knowing that a win for either would see their team claim the title.

Ultimately, Spain successfully defended their title by winning the match by a single goal and claimed their second league title.

Participating teams
Six teams took part in the 2000 season of the EBSL.

Organisation

Format
The format remained the same as that established in 1998, only adjusted to the differing number of stages this year than in previous editions as follows:

Matches were split into six rounds of fixtures known as stages, with two stages hosted Spain and one in France, Italy, Monaco and Portugal, whilst the participating nations of Germany and the Netherlands did not host any stage. Four teams took part in each, three joining the host nation of that particular stage, with each individual team taking part in four of the six stages overall.

Each stage was played as a small knock-out tournament, with semi finals, the final and a third place decider being the fixtures throughout all six rounds. Teams earned points for their successes per game and per stage which were then tallied up in the final league table.

The team who topped the table after all six stages was crowned the winner of the league.

Point distribution
Points were allocated for the following achievements in each stage, contributing to the final points total in the league table.

Stages

Stage 1
The first stage took place in Saint-Galmier, France. Italy claimed the opening stage title of the season.

Stage 2
The second stage took place in Palma de Mallorca, Mallorca, Spain. Despite taking place in Spain, since they were not hosting in their own country, this was considered as the German stage, who took on the status of de facto hosts.

The Spanish were the victors in the second stage.

Stage 3
The third stage took place in Cadiz, Spain. The hosts claimed their second consecutive stage crown.

Stage 4
The fourth stage took place in Vila Nova de Gaia, Portugal. Portugal won their first stage as hosts.

Stage 5
The fifth stage took place in Cattolica, Italy. France became the fourth unique nation of the season to win a stage.

Stage 6
The sixth stage took place in Monte Carlo, Monaco. Despite taking place in Monaco, since they were not hosting in their own country, this was considered as the Dutch stage, who took on the status of de facto hosts. Spain, France and Portugal all went into the final stage with a chance of claiming the title.

Spain secured the title by beating Portugal in the final match of the season to claim the stage.

Stage Winners

Final Table

Winners

References

Sources
 Roonba
 Calciatori
 BSWW
 RSSSF

Euro Beach Soccer League
2000 in beach soccer